The Pectinoidea are a superfamily of marine bivalve molluscs, including the scallops and spiny oysters.

Shell anatomy
All members of this superfamily have a triangular resilium with a nonmineralized medial core that functions below the hinge line.

Families
According to the World Register of Marine Species, the Pectinoidea include these families:
 Cyclochlamydidae
 Entoliidae
 Neitheidae †
 Pectinidae (scallops)
 Pleuronectitidae †
 Propeamussiidae some are known as glass scallops
 Spondylidae thorny oysters
 Tosapectinidae †

Families brought into synonymy
 Propeamussidae: synonym of Propeamussiidae
 Syncyclonematidae: synonym of Entoliidae

References
 Raines, B. K. & Poppe, G. T. (2006): "The Family Pectinidae". In: Poppe, G. T. & Groh, K.: A Conchological Iconography. 402 pp., 320 color plts., ConchBooks, Hackenheim, .
 Bieler R., Carter J.G. & Coan E.V. (2010). Classification of Bivalve families. pp. 113–133, in: Bouchet P. & Rocroi J.-P. (2010), Nomenclator of Bivalve Families. Malacologia 52(2): 1-184.
 Dijkstra H.H. & Maestrati P. (2012) Pectinoidea (Mollusca, Bivalvia, Propeamussiidae, Cyclochlamydidae n. fam., Entoliidae and Pectinidae) from the Vanuatu Archipelago. Zoosystema 34(2): 389-408. [29 June 2012]

Further reading
 Henk H. Dijkstra & Bruce A. Marshall, The Recent Pectinoidea of the New Zealand region (Mollusca: Bivalvia: Propeamussiidae, Pectinidae and Spondylidae); Molluscan Research 28(1): 1-88; published 14 Mar. 2008 (abstract)

Mollusc superfamilies
Pectinida